This is a list of the winners of the Bavarian Film Awards Special Award.

1986 Willy Bogner
1988 Vicco von Bülow
1990  and all of his German Coworkers
1991 Heinz Badewitz
1996 Wolfgang Panzer
1997 Ben Becker, Heino Ferch, Ulrich Noethen, Heinrich Schafmeister, Max Tidof, Kai Wiesinger
2001 Michael "Bully" Herbig
2005 Christian Wagner
2006 Joseph Vilsmaier & Dana Vávrová
2007 Veit Helmer

References
https://www.stmd.bayern.de/wp-content/uploads/2020/08/Bayerische-Filmpreisträger-bis-2020.pdf

Bavarian film awards